The 2018 FIBA Women's European Championship for Small Countries was the 15th edition of this competition. The tournament took place in Cork, Republic of Ireland, from 26 June to 1 July 2018. Denmark women's national basketball team won the tournament for the first time.

Participating teams

Group phase
In this round, the teams were drawn into two groups of four. The first two teams from each group advance to the semifinals, the other teams will play in the 5th–8th place playoffs.

Group A

Group B

5th–8th place playoffs

5th–8th place semifinals

7th place match

5th place match

Championship playoffs

Semifinals

3rd place match

Final

Final standings

References

FIBA Women's European Championship for Small Countries
Small Countries
International sports competitions hosted by Ireland
Women's basketball competitions in Ireland
2018 in Irish women's sport
FIBA Women's European Championship for Small Countries
FIBA Women's European Championship for Small Countries